The 2013 Hollywood Casino 400 was a NASCAR Sprint Cup Series race that was held on October 6, 2013, at Kansas Speedway in Kansas City, Kansas. Contested over 267 laps on the 1.5–mile (2.4 km) oval, it was the 30th race of the 2013 Sprint Cup Series championship, and the 4th race in the Chase for the Sprint Cup. Kevin Harvick of Richard Childress Racing won the race, his third win of the season, while Kurt Busch finished second and Jeff Gordon finished third.

The 15 cautions flown during the race were a track record.

Results

Qualifying

Race results

Standings after the race

Drivers' Championship standings

Manufacturers' Championship standings

Note: Only the first thirteen positions are included for the driver standings.

References

Hollywood Casino 400
Hollywood Casino 400
Hollywood Casino 400
NASCAR races at Kansas Speedway